Baskaki is a rural locality (a village) in Nebylovskoye Rural Settlement, Yuryev-Polsky District, Vladimir Oblast, Russia. The population was 17 as of 2010.

Geography 
Baskaki is located on the Irmes River, 42 km southeast of Yuryev-Polsky (the district's administrative centre) by road. Dergayevo is the nearest rural locality.

References 

Rural localities in Yuryev-Polsky District
Suzdalsky Uyezd